Losing Touch may refer to:

"Losing Touch", 2000 single by My Vitriol from Finelines
"Losing Touch", song by Barry Manilow from Even Now
"Losing Touch", song by The Killers from Day & Age 2008